Aatamin puvussa ja vähän Eevankin is a 1940 Finnish comedy film directed by Ossi Elstelä and written by Nisse Hirn based on the novel by Yrjö Soini. The film runtime is 77 minutes.

Cast
Sirkka Sipilä....  Alli 
Tauno Palo ....  Aarne Himanen 
Leo Lähteenmäki ....  Paavo Kehkonen 
Jalmari Rinne....  Viirimäki 
Yrjö Tuominen ....  Vilho Vikström 
Valter Tuomi ....  Police chief 
Irja Kuusla ....  Liina 
Maikki Sälehovi ....  Puuska's wife 
Rafael Stenius ....  Puuska

See also
Aatamin puvussa ja vähän Eevankin (1931 film)
Two Times Adam, One Time Eve (1959 West German film)
Aatamin puvussa ja vähän Eevankin (1971 film)

External links
 

1940 comedy films
1940 films
Finnish black-and-white films
1940s Finnish-language films
Films based on Finnish novels
Finnish comedy films
Remakes of Finnish films